The Volunteer State Athletic Conference (VSAC) was a college athletic conference which was predominantly for smaller colleges in the U.S. state of Tennessee.

History
The VSAC was organized in the 1940s and dissolved in the early 1980s.  Member schools were in the National Association of Intercollegiate Athletics (NAIA).  Long-term members of the conference included the institutions now known as Belmont University, Bethel University, Bryan College, Carson–Newman University, Christian Brothers University, King University, Lee University, Lincoln Memorial University, Lipscomb University, Milligan College, Tusculum University, Tennessee Wesleyan University, and Union University, as well as the now-defunct Lambuth University.

Dissolution
The conference dissolved when the institutions in the eastern portion of the state seceded to form the Tennessee Valley Athletic Conference (TVAC).  Those in the western part of the state formed in turn the Tennessee Collegiate Athletic Conference (TCAC).  The Appalachian Athletic Conference is the direct successor of the TVAC, and was known as such until the mid-1990s when the addition of schools in Virginia, Kentucky, and North Carolina necessitated the name change. The TranSouth Athletic Conference, which operated from 1996 to 2013, is sometimes regarded as something of a successor to the TCAC. Sponsorship of football by the conference ended after the 1962 season, over two decades before the conference dissolved with regard to its other sports.

Other founding members of the VSAC included East Tennessee State University, Middle Tennessee State University, Austin Peay State University, and Tennessee Technological University; these schools all left the VSAC to join the Ohio Valley Conference. As of 2019, Austin Peay and Tennessee Tech remain in the OVC, while East Tennessee State is in the Southern Conference and Middle Tennessee in Conference USA.

Football champions

 1947 – Middle Tennessee
 1948 – 
 1949 – Middle Tennessee
 1950 – Middle Tennessee
 1951 – Middle Tennessee
 1952 – Middle Tennessee
 1953 –  and Middle Tennessee
 1954 – 

 1955 – Middle Tennessee
 1956 – Middle Tennessee
 1957 – Middle Tennessee
 1958 – Unknown
 1959 – Unknown
 1960 – 
 1962 –

See also
List of defunct college football conferences

References